Vladek Sheybal (born Władysław Rudolf Zbigniew Sheybal; 12 March 1923 – 16 October 1992) was a Polish character actor, singer and director of both television and stage productions. He was well known for his portrayal of the chess grandmaster Kronsteen in the James Bond film From Russia with Love (1963), a role for which he had been personally recommended by his friend Sean Connery, and as Otto Leipzig in Smiley's People (1982).

He became a naturalised British citizen, but remained "fiercely proud of his homeland and its culture."

Life and career
Sheybal was born in Zgierz, near Łódź, in the Second Polish Republic. The son of a university professor, he was attracted to acting at an early age. At the age of 16 he was imprisoned in a Nazi concentration camp during the occupation of Poland; escaping twice only to be recaptured and subjected to torture as punishment. After World War II ended, he began performing in Polish theatres and cinemas, earning a reputation as a skilled actor. He appeared in the film Kanał (1957, credited as Władysław Sheybal), directed by Andrzej Wajda, before departing for Paris and then Vienna in 1958 owing to his political opposition to the Communist Party.

Having difficulty finding work, he immigrated to Britain in 1959 where his reputation from Polish films lent him enough credibility to support himself teaching acting. He was soon appearing on the London stage, and was hired as the director of the Bromley Little Theatre in 1960.  That same year he directed a production of Modest Mussorgsky's Khovanshchina at Oxford University. This production was seen by executives of the BBC, and it led to work as a director for opera and theatre adaptations on British television in the early 1960s, including works for ITV Play of the Week in 1961–1962 and as well as productions for the BBC. In 1964 he had a triumphant success on the British stage as "He" in Leonid Andreyev's He Who Gets Slapped at the Hampstead Theatre.

In 1963 he made his British cinema debut playing the evil secret agent Kronsteen in the James Bond film From Russia with Love. He appeared often in villainous roles or character parts in British cinema up until his death in 1992. He also appeared as Holocaust survivor Egon Sobotnik in the television mini-series QB VII. He had a dual role as "the Director" and as Pierre Louys in Ken Russell's The Debussy Film (1965), one of Russell's composer biopics for the BBC. Other Russell films in which he appeared were Billion Dollar Brain (1967), Women in Love (1969) and The Boy Friend (1971).

His other films include Casino Royale (1967), Doppelgänger (1969), The Last Valley, Puppet on a Chain, Innocent Bystanders, The Wind and the Lion, The Lady Vanishes (1979), Fire and Sword and Red Dawn.

Sheybal's other TV credits include Z-Cars, Danger Man, The Troubleshooters, The Saint, The Human Jungle, The Baron, The Champions, Callan, Strange Report, UFO, The New Avengers, Supernatural (1977), Lord Mountbatten: The Last Viceroy, Shōgun, Smiley's People, and The Man in Room 17.

In 1977, he won the Dracula Society's prestigious Hamilton Deane Award for his performance in the BBC play Night of the Marionettes, part of the Supernatural series, in which he played a sinister Austrian innkeeper whose life-size puppets supposedly inspired Mary Shelley's Frankenstein. Sheybal's final stage appearance was as Friedrich Nietzsche in the Pierre Bourgeade play The Eagle and the Serpent at London's Offstage Downstairs Theatre in 1988.

He died in London in 1992, aged 69, from a ruptured aortic aneurysm. He is buried in Putney Vale Cemetery.

In years 1950-1957 he was in a relationship with actress Irena Eichlerówna. In England Sheybal dated both men and women, but formed no long-term relationship.

Selected filmography 

Kanał (1957) - Michał 'Ogromny', the composer
Trzy Kobiety (1957) - Gestapo Officer
From Russia with Love (1963) - chess grandmaster Tov Kronsteen
Return from the Ashes (1965) - Paul, Chess Club Manager
Casino Royale (1967) - Le Chiffre's Representative
Billion Dollar Brain (1967) - Dr. Eiwort
The Fearless Vampire Killers (1967) - Herbert von Krolock (voice) 
To Grab the Ring (1968) - Mijnheer Smith
Deadfall (1968) - Dr. Delgado
The Limbo Line (1968) - Oleg
Mosquito Squadron (1969) - Lieutenant Schack
Doppelgänger (1969) - Psychiatrist
Women in Love (1969) - Loerke
Leo the Last (1970) - Laszlo
UFO (1970) - Dr. Douglas Jackson
Puppet on a Chain (1970) - Meegern
The Last Valley (1971) - Mathias
The Boy Friend (1971) - De Thril
Pilate and Others (1972) – Caiaphas
The Spy's Wife (1972) - Vladek
Innocent Bystanders (1972) - Aaron Kaplan
Scorpio (1973) - Zemetkin
Shado (1974) - Dr. Doug Jackson
Invasion: UFO (1974) - Dr. Doug Jackson
S*P*Y*S (1974) - Borisenko
 The Kiss (1974) - Portiere d'albergo
UFO: Distruggete base Luna! (1974) - Dr. Doug Jackson
The Wind and the Lion (1975) - The Bashaw
House of Pleasure for Women (1976) - Francesco
The Sell Out (1976) - Dutchman
Gulliver's Travels (1977) - President of Blefuscu (voice)
Hamlet (1979) - Player Queen / Lucianus / 1st Player
The Lady Vanishes (1979) - Trainmaster
Avalanche Express (1979) - Zannbin
Shōgun (1980) - Captain Ferriera
The Apple (1980) - Boogalow
All About a Prima Ballerina (1980) - Marcus
Fire and Sword (1981) - Andret
Marco Polo (1982) - Prosecuting Reverend
Where Is Parsifal? (1984) - George
Memed My Hawk (1984) - Ali 
Red Dawn (1984) - General Bratchenko
The Jigsaw Man (1984) - Gen. Zorin
Champagne Charlie (1989) - Count Plasky
Strike It Rich (1990) - Kinski
After Midnight (1990) - Hiyam El-Afi, The Hotel Manager
Double X: The Name of the Game (1992) - Pawnbroker

References

External links
 
 

1923 births
1992 deaths
20th-century Polish male actors
Alumni of Merton College, Oxford
Burials at Putney Vale Cemetery
Deaths from aortic aneurysm
Naturalised citizens of the United Kingdom
Nazi concentration camp survivors
People from Zgierz
Polish emigrants to the United Kingdom
Polish male film actors
Polish male stage actors
Polish male television actors
Polish people of Jewish descent
British male stage actors
British male film actors
British male television actors
Polish LGBT actors
Bisexual male actors
Polish bisexual people
British bisexual people